Stepan Kachala (Ukrainian Степан Качала, Polish Stefan Kaczała) (1815 – 1888) was a Ukrainian politician and writer.

Born in Firlejów near Berezhany (now in Ivano-Frankivsk Oblast), he graduated from a gymnasium in Berezhany and then the Lviv seminary. In 1842, he became a Greek-Catholic priest.

In the late 1860s, a Galician priest, Father Stepan Kachala, made an inquiry into the causes of the Ukrainian peasant’s poverty and then formulated a social program that the Greek Catholic clergy as a whole soon
adopted for its own. He did not find the roots of the peasant’s poverty where secular investigators have suggested these roots lay: in the
inequitable terms of emancipation, in the transition to a money economy,
and in the absence of factory industry to absorb the surplus labor in the countryside. Instead, Father Kalacha found the peasant guilty of vices that led to his impoverishment: drunkenness, prodigality, and sloth. As antidotes to these vices, he suggested, among other things, abstinence, thrift, and enterprise.

From 1861, Rev Stepan Kachala was a Ukrainian representative to the Galician Sejm, and a head of the Ruthenian Club (Ukrainian Руськiй клуб, Polish Klub Ruski) in the parliament in 1873-1879.

References

1815 births
1888 deaths
People from Ivano-Frankivsk Oblast
People from the Kingdom of Galicia and Lodomeria
Members of the Ukrainian Greek Catholic Church
Members of the Austrian House of Deputies (1873–1879)
Members of the Diet of Galicia and Lodomeria
Ukrainian politicians before 1991